The Big Mambo is a 1998 German comedy film written and directed by Michael Gwisdek. It was entered into the 48th Berlin International Film Festival.

Cast
In alphabetical order

References

External links

1998 films
1998 comedy films
German comedy films
1990s German-language films
Films directed by Michael Gwisdek
1990s German films